Lewesiceras is a genus of large ammonites belonging to the order Ammonitida and the family Pachydiscidae.

They lived in the late Cretaceous period, in the Cenomanian and Turonian ages, which occurred 99.6-89.3 million years ago. These shelled ammonoids were nektonic, fast-moving and carnivorous.

Fossils distribution
Cretaceous of Armenia, France, Germany, United States (Texas), Uzbekistan.

Species
 Lewesiceras mantelli Wright and Wright, 1951
 Lewesiceras peramplum (Mantell, 1822)
 Lewesiceras wiedmanni Wright & Kennedy, 1984

Gallery

References
Biolib
The Paleobiology Database
Sepkoski, Jack  Sepkoski's Online Genus Database – Cephalopods
Ammonitida

Cretaceous ammonites
Fossils of France
Desmoceratoidea
Ammonitida genera